Simone Pasa (born 21 January 1994) is an Italian footballer who  plays for  club Rimini, as a defender.

Career

Internazionale and loans
Pasa made his debut in the Europa League on 6 December 2012 against Neftchi Baku. His first game in Serie A was on 12 May 2013 with Internazionale, in a scoreless draw away to Genoa, playing the whole 90 minutes.

On 9 July 2014, Pasa was signed by A.C. Prato in a temporary deal.

On 26 August 2015, he was signed by Pordenone in a temporary deal.

Cittadella
On 1 July 2016, Pasa was signed by Serie B club Cittadella on a free transfer.

Pordenone
On 12 August 2019, he returned to Pordenone, which was promoted to Serie B. He signed a 2-year contract.

Rimini
On 18 July 2022, Pasa signed a two-year contract with Rimini.

References

1994 births
People from Montebelluna
Sportspeople from the Province of Treviso
Footballers from Veneto
Living people
Association football defenders
Italian footballers
Inter Milan players
S.S.D. Varese Calcio players
Calcio Padova players
A.C. Prato players
Pordenone Calcio players
A.S. Cittadella players
Rimini F.C. 1912 players
Serie A players
Serie B players
Serie C players
Italy youth international footballers